Joseph Yannick N'Djeng (born 11 March 1990) is a Cameroonian football player who plays.

International career
N'Djeng was capped 5 times for the national team during 2012–2013. In 2021 was reappeared in the Cameroon's squad for 2020 African Nations Championship.

Club career
On November 13, 2008, N'Djeng went on trial with Algerian club JSM Béjaïa and quickly impressed head coach Djamel Menad. On January 29, 2009, N'Djeng made his debut for the club as a starter in a league game against USM Alger. In his first season, he scored 3 goals in 15 league games.

On July 9, 2011, N'Djeng joined Tunisian club Espérance, signing a three-year contract with the club. The transfer fee was not disclosed but rumored to be around €600,000.

In August 2019, N'Djeng joined Kuwaiti club Al-Yarmouk. His contract was terminated in May 2020.

Statistics

References

External links
 DZFoot.com Profile
 
 

1990 births
Living people
Footballers from Yaoundé
Cameroonian footballers
Association football forwards
Cameroon international footballers
Cameroonian expatriate footballers
Expatriate footballers in Algeria
Expatriate footballers in Tunisia
Expatriate footballers in Switzerland
Expatriate footballers in Malaysia
Expatriate footballers in Belarus
Expatriate footballers in Kuwait
Cameroonian expatriate sportspeople in Algeria
Cameroonian expatriate sportspeople in Tunisia
Cameroonian expatriate sportspeople in Switzerland
Cameroonian expatriate sportspeople in Malaysia
Cameroonian expatriate sportspeople in Belarus
Cameroonian expatriate sportspeople in Saudi Arabia
Algerian Ligue Professionnelle 1 players
Swiss Super League players
Canon Yaoundé players
JSM Béjaïa players
Espérance Sportive de Tunis players
FC Sion players
Terengganu F.C. II players
FC Neman Grodno players
Khaleej FC players
Saudi First Division League players
2020 African Nations Championship players
Al-Yarmouk SC (Kuwait) players
Kuwait Premier League players
Cameroonian expatriate sportspeople in Kuwait
Cameroon A' international footballers